The Rural Municipality of Parkdale No. 498 is a rural municipality (RM) in the Canadian province of Saskatchewan within Census Division No. 17 and  Division No. 6.

History 
The RM of Parkdale No. 498 incorporated as a rural municipality on January 1, 1913.

Geography

Communities and localities 
The following urban municipalities are surrounded by the RM.

Villages
 Glaslyn

Resort villages
 Turtle View (incorporated on January 1, 2020 through the amalgamation of the organized hamlets of Turtle Lake Lodge and Indian Point – Golden Sands)

The following unincorporated communities are within the RM.

Organized hamlets
 Fairholme

Localities
 Evergreen Acres
 Helen Lake
 Horseshoe Bay
 Longhope
 Midnight Lake
 Minnehaha
 Park Bluff
 Robinhood
 Speedwell
 Sunset View Beach

Demographics 

Attractions 
 Little Loon Lake
Little Loon Lake Regional Park
 Turtle Lake
Turtle Lake Provincial Recreation Site

Government 
The RM of Parkdale No. 498 is governed by an elected municipal council and an appointed administrator that meets on the second Wednesday of every month. The reeve of the RM is Daniel Hicks while its administrator is Ashela McCullough. The RM's office is located in Glaslyn.

Transportation 
 Saskatchewan Highway 3
 Saskatchewan Highway 4
 Saskatchewan Highway 794
 Canadian Pacific Railway (abandoned)
 Glaslyn Airport

See also 
List of rural municipalities in Saskatchewan

References

External links 

P
Division No. 17, Saskatchewan